The 9th Mieczysław Połukard Criterium of Polish Speedway League Aces was the 1990 version of the Mieczysław Połukard Criterium of Polish Speedway Leagues Aces. It took place on March 25 in the Polonia Stadium in Bydgoszcz, Poland.

Starting positions draw 

 Ryszard Dołomisiewicz - Polonia Bydgoszcz
 Jan Krzystyniak - Stal Rzeszów
 Piotr Świst - Stal Gorzów Wlkp.
 Jerzy Głogowski - Motor Lublin
 Antoni Skupień - ROW Rybnik
 Jacek Gomólski - Start Gniezno
 Zenon Kasprzak - Unia Leszno
 Sławomir Drabik - Włókniarz Częstochowa
 Wojciech Załuski - Kolejarz Opole
 Janusz Stachyra - Stal Rzeszów
 Tomasz Gollob - Polonia Bydgoszcz
 Andrzej Huszcza - Falubaz Zielona Góra
 Wojciech Żabiałowicz - Apator Toruń
 Jacek Woźniak - Polonia Bydgoszcz
 Jacek Rempała - Unia Tarnów
 Jarosław Olszewski - Wybrzeże Gdańsk

Heat details

Sources 
 Roman Lach - Polish Speedway Almanac

See also 

Mieczyslaw Polukard
Mieczysław Połukard Criterium of Polish Speedway Leagues Aces
Mieczyslaw Polukard